The Central District of Bahmai County is a district (bakhsh) in Bahmai County, Kohgiluyeh and Boyer-Ahmad Province, Iran. At the 2006 census, its population was 22,193, in 4,085 families.  The District has one city: Likak. The District has two rural districts (dehestan): Bahmai-ye Garmsiri-ye Jonubi Rural District and Kafsh Kanan Rural District.

References 

Districts of Kohgiluyeh and Boyer-Ahmad Province
Bahmai County